Phungia rufa is a species of beetle in the genus Phungia of the family Mordellidae. It was described in 1922.

References

Mordellidae
Beetles described in 1922